The Zagreb Oblast was an administrative division of the Kingdom of Serbs, Croats and Slovenes. It existed from 1922 to 1929 and its capital was in the city of Zagreb.

Oblast elections
Elections to oblasts were held once on January 23, 1927.

See also
Zagreb County

References

1920s in Zagreb
Oblasts of the Kingdom of Serbs, Croats and Slovenes
Yugoslav Croatia